Kritika Rajya Lakshmi Devi Shah of Nepal (born 16 October 2004) is the youngest daughter of  Former Crown Prince Paras and  Former Crown Princess Himani. She is a granddaughter of  Former King Gyanendra.

Biography 

Like her sister, Purnika of Nepal, Kritika was not originally in the line of succession to the Nepalese Throne; however, in July 2006 the Nepalese government proposed changing the succession law to absolute primogeniture.

On 28 May 2008, the Nepalese monarchy was abolished and replaced with a secular federal republic. In July 2008 Princess Kritika left Nepal with her mother, sister and brother to move to Singapore to join her father who had been making arrangements for the family to live in the country.

References

External links
Royal Court of Nepal

2003 births
Living people
Nepalese princesses
Nepalese royalty
21st-century Nepalese nobility
Nepalese Hindus
Nepalese people of Indian descent